The Newport 27S-2, or Newport 27S-II, is an American sailboat that was designed by the Canadian design firm C&C Design as a cruiser and first built in 1978.

Production
The design was built by Capital Yachts in Harbor City, California, United States, starting in 1978, but it is now out of production.

Design
The Newport 27S-2 is a recreational keelboat, built predominantly of fiberglass, with wood trim. It has a masthead sloop rig, a raked stem, a plumb transom, an spade-type rudder controlled by a wheel and a fixed fin keel. It displaces .

The design has sleeping accommodation for four people, with a double "V"-berth in the bow cabin and two straight settee berths in the main cabin. The galley is located on both sides of the companionway ladder, with a two-burner stove to starboard and a sink and ice box to port. The head is located just aft of the bow cabin on the port side and includes a shower.

See also
List of sailing boat types

References

Keelboats
1970s sailboat type designs
Sailing yachts
Sailboat type designs by C&C Design
Sailboat types built by Capital Yachts